Llanddewi Skirrid is a village in Monmouthshire, south east Wales, United Kingdom.

Location 

History and amenities 
The Skirrid mountain overlooks the village and parish. The Skirrid is a stand-alone mountain, an outlier of the Black Mountains, Wales and the most easterly mountain within the Brecon Beacons National Park. The Church of St David is of mediaeval origins but was almost completely rebuilt in the 19th century by John Prichard for the local landowner Crawshay Bailey, Junior.

The Walnut Tree restaurant was opened in the early 1960s, and eventually became Michelin starred for its Italian/Welsh fusion cuisine. After the original owner retired, it was taken over by his son. After losing its Michelin rating it was featured on the Channel 4 television show Ramsay's Kitchen Nightmares.  It closed in 2007 before reopening with new owners, and was later named the best restaurant in Britain, and was awarded a fresh Michelin star in 2010.

References

External links
 A local community website 
 www.geograph.co.uk : photos of Llanddewi Skirrid and surrounding area

Villages in Monmouthshire